Raja Ravi Varma College of Fine Arts is located in Mavelikkara, Kerala, India. The college offers undergraduate degree course in fine arts, including in sculpture, painting and applied arts. This government institution is affiliated with the University of Kerala and is under the administration of Directorate of Technical Education, Govt. of Kerala.

History
The college was established by Rama Varma son of Raja Ravi Varma in 1915 as a training institute. It became a Government institution after independence and was upgraded to Fine Arts College in the year 2000.

Organization
The administration of the college is under the Department of Technical Education,Kerala and Department of Higher Education. Raja Ravi Varma college is affiliated with the University of Kerala.

Admission
Admission to Bachelor Degree courses conducted in Raja Ravi Varma College of Fine Arts is made through an Entrance examination conducted by the Directorate of Technical Education, Kerala. The basic qualification to apply is Plus Two or equivalent for Bachelor of Fine Arts  courses.

Academic Courses
Forty one students are taken in annually for training in painting, sculpture and applied arts, leading to a Bachelor of Fine Arts (BFA) degree. 

Following are the list of courses offered 
 Bachelor of Fine Arts in Painting
 Bachelor of Fine Arts in Sculpture
 Bachelor of Fine Arts in Applied Art

Noted faculty and alumni
Following are the list of notable faculty and alumni of the college 
 C. K. Ra
 K. Shankar Pillai
 Kattoor Narayana Pillai
 N.N. Rimzon
 P. K. Manthri
 R. Gopakumar
 Sosa Joseph
 Sreeraj Gopinathan
 T.A.S Menon
 T.R. Udayakumar

See also
Raja Ravi Varma
College of Fine Arts Trivandrum

References

Art schools in India
Arts and Science colleges in Kerala
Colleges affiliated to the University of Kerala
Universities and colleges in Alappuzha district
Educational institutions established in 1915
Arts organizations established in 1915
1915 establishments in India
Raja Ravi Varma